Elachista maculosa is a moth in the family Elachistidae. It was described by Parenti in 1981. It is found in Afghanistan.

References

Moths described in 1981
maculosa
Moths of Asia